Noel Knothe (born 5 May 1999) is a German professional footballer who plays as a centre-back for FSV Frankfurt in Regionalliga Südwest.

Career
Knothe made his professional debut for 1. FC Nürnberg in the 2. Bundesliga on 6 December 2020, coming on as a substitute in the 78th minute for Nikola Dovedan against SC Paderborn. The away match finished as a 2–0 win for Nürnberg.

On 1 July 2022, Knothe signed with FSV Frankfurt.

References

External links
 
 
 
 

1999 births
Living people
People from Main-Taunus-Kreis
Sportspeople from Darmstadt (region)
Footballers from Hesse
German footballers
Association football central defenders
Eintracht Frankfurt players
FC Pipinsried players
1. FC Nürnberg II players
1. FC Nürnberg players
FSV Frankfurt players
2. Bundesliga players
Regionalliga players